Susan Martinez (born 1966) is an American union leader and former politician. A Democrat, she served in the Nevada State Assembly from 2018-2022, representing Nevada Assembly District 12. Upon her election as the Executive Secretary Treasurer of the Nevada State AFL-CIO, Martinez announced that she would not seek re-election in the 2022 elections.

Early life
Martinez's family moved to the United States in 1959. Martinez was born in 1966 in Las Vegas, Nevada.

Education
Martinez graduated from Eldorado High School. Martinez majored in general education at the College of Southern Nevada.

Career
Martinez worked as a guest service agent at Flamingo Las Vegas for more than 30 years. As a Teamsters Local 986 union member, Martinez served as a shop steward and advocated for her co-workers through grievance and contract negotiations to fight for stronger wages, better benefits, and safer working conditions. In 2018, Martinez was elected to the Nevada Assembly, where she represented the 12th district from November 6, 2018 until November 8, 2022. In August 2021, Martinez announced that she would not seek re-election after becoming the head of the Nevada State AFL-CIO.

Personal life
Martinez has one daughter, Victoria.

References

Living people
1966 births
Politicians from Las Vegas
Hispanic and Latino American state legislators in Nevada
Hispanic and Latino American women in politics
College of Southern Nevada alumni
Democratic Party members of the Nevada Assembly
21st-century American politicians
21st-century American women politicians
Women state legislators in Nevada